Cardiacephala is a genus of flies in the family Micropezidae.

Names brought to synonymy
Cardiacephala elegans is a synonym for Plocoscelus podagricus.

References

External links 

 
 Cardiacephala at insectoid.info

Micropezidae
Nerioidea genera